Rathbeagh is a hill on the River Nore in the parish of Lisdowney near Ballyragget, County Kilkenny, Ireland. The Irish language name is Rath Beithigh, meaning "the rath (ringfort) of the birch trees".  According to local tradition, the ringfort is the burial place of Heremon, son of the Celtic leader Milesius. It is located in an ancient valley once called Mágh Airgid Rois ("plain of the silver wood").

The whole structure overlooks a bend on the Nore. The river is fordable at this location, so strategically the fort controlled the crossing. Parts of the rath are being eroded by the presence of livestock in the field.

The church is built on the site of an earlier castle or stronghouse. Remains of what are believed to be stables or workshops were discovered in the adjacent field. The earliest gravestone date that can be distinguished in the graveyard is 1715.

Just east of the old church is a pond under the road, known locally as Poll Leabhair, meaning "pond of the book" or "hole of the book". According to tradition, the church was desecrated during the Cromwellian wars, and the Missal was dumped in this pond. In the mid-19th century, the church bell was found in a sand-pit in a nearby field and was presented to the Church of Ireland church in Killeshan, Carlow, according to Carrigan's History of Ossory.

A well nearby is known as St. Catherine's Well. Its specific location is unclear, but it is somewhere a short distance south of Poll Leabhair and between the field known as The Paddock and the river Nore. Oral history records that the well's water was used as a cure for eye disease.

Notable residents
 Kepple Elias and Mary Disney - parents of Elias Disney and grandparents of Walt Disney

References

Archaeological sites in County Kilkenny